Damien Delaney is a former Gaelic footballer for Laois.

He won a Leinster Senior Football Championship medal with Laois in 2003 and he also helped Laois to a Leinster Under 21 Football title in 1994.

With his club, Stradbally, Delaney picked up three Laois Senior Football Championship medals in 1997, 1998 and 2005.

His father Sean was also a noted Laois sportsman. He has 5 children.

External links
Hogan Stand magazine profile

1973 births
Living people
Laois inter-county Gaelic footballers
Stradbally (Laois) Gaelic footballers